FC Akron Tolyatti is a Russian professional football club based in Tolyatti founded in 2018 that plays in the Russian First League.

History
In June 2019, it was confirmed that the club will enter the Russian Professional Football League in the 2019–20 season.

On 15 May 2020, the 2019–20 PFL season was abandoned due to COVID-19 pandemic in Russia. As Akron was leading in their PFL zone at the time, they were promoted to the second-tier FNL for the 2020–21 season.

Akron finished their first FNL season in 17th place, which would normally mean relegation. On 15 May 2021, FNL confirmed that FC Tambov, which placed last in the Premier League and was expected to be relegated to FNL, did not apply for the FNL license for the 2021–22 season and therefore Akron was be relegated.

In June 2022, Akron became the backer of Konoplyov football academy.

Current squad
As of 22 February 2023, according to the FNL website.

Out on loan

See also
 FC Academiya
 Konoplyov football academy

External links
FC Akron Tolyatti

References

Association football clubs established in 2018
Football clubs in Russia
Sport in Tolyatti
2018 establishments in Russia